Lorenzo Lollo (born 8 December 1990) is an Italian professional footballer who plays for  club Triestina, as a central midfielder.

Club career

Spezia Calcio
Born in Carrara, Lollo made his senior debuts with Spezia in Serie C2, taking part of the squad who was promoted to Serie C1 in the 2009–10 season. In the following two seasons he appeared less than 20 times in each one, also winning another promotion in his second (third at the club).

On 22 September 2012 Lollo made his Serie B debut, starting in a 0–2 home loss against Sassuolo; he scored his first professional goal on 28 March of the following year, netting his side's last of a 2–0 success at Crotone.

Carpi
On 14 August 2013, Lollo joined fellow second-divisioner Carpi on loan, with a buyout clause. He made 33 appearances in Serie B as Carpi finished 12th.

Following Lollo's successful loan with the Biancorossi during the 2013–14, Carpi exercised their right to purchase Lollo outright.

Empoli

Loan to Padova
On 15 January 2019, he joined Padova on loan.

Venezia
On 19 August 2019, he signed a 2-year contract with Venezia.

Bari
On 29 September 2020, he moved to Serie C club Bari on a three-year contract. On 27 January 2022, he moved on loan to Legnago.

Reggina
On 26 July 2022, Lollo joined Reggina.

Triestina
Lollo appeared once on the bench for Reggina before moving to Triestina on 1 September 2022.

References

External links

1990 births
People from Carrara
Sportspeople from the Province of Massa-Carrara
Living people
Association football midfielders
Italian footballers
Spezia Calcio players
A.C. Carpi players
Empoli F.C. players
Calcio Padova players
Venezia F.C. players
S.S.C. Bari players
F.C. Legnago Salus players
Reggina 1914 players
U.S. Triestina Calcio 1918 players
Serie A players
Serie B players
Serie C players
Footballers from Tuscany